Humberside Fire and Rescue Service (HFRS) is the statutory fire and rescue service covering the area of what was the county of Humberside (1974–1996), but now consists of the unitary authorities of East Riding of Yorkshire, Kingston upon Hull, North Lincolnshire and North East Lincolnshire in northern England.

History

Humberside Fire Brigade was formed in 1974 as a result of the Fire Services Act 1947 stating that all areas must have an official fire service; the brigade would later change its name to Humberside Fire and Rescue Service to reflect its expanded role in emergency cover after the county boundary changes on 1974. When Humberside County Council was abolished in 1995, a parliamentary combination order came into effect, establishing Humberside Fire Authority (the current ruling body of Humberside Fire Brigade) with control of all brigade personnel, equipment and premises. This is a combined fire authority, which is financed by the constituent councils of East Riding of Yorkshire Council, Kingston upon Hull City Council, North Lincolnshire Council and North East Lincolnshire Council.

In 2007, HFRS featured on a BBC One show entitled Women on Fire. Cameras followed two female firefighters during a 16-day intensive training course to allow them to become retained firefighters for Humberside Fire and Rescue Service.

Sledmere fire station was closed in 2008 as part of cost-saving measures introduced by HFRS.

On 1 January 2013, plans were submitted to Hull City Council expressing Humberside Fire and Rescue Service's intention to replace Clough Road fire station with a new £3.9million facility on the existing site. Planning permission was granted by Hull City Council in April 2013, and the new station became operational in July 2015. Two new fire stations in central Hull and Brough were opened in 2017, and in 2018, the £9 million Jean Bishop Integrated Care Centre (ICC), part of which contains a new fire station for the East Hull area, was opened. HFRS plans to extend Hornsea fire station to add a new appliance bay accommodating one of two new Rapid Intervention Vehicles acquired from Gatwick Airport in 2022.

In 2016, in line with other fire and police force mergers, a proposal was put forward that Humberside Fire and Rescue merge with the North Yorkshire Fire and Rescue Service. However, the proposal was not backed by the leaders of county councils and emergency commissioners in the Humberside operating area, and so the merger proposal was shelved.

Performance
In 2021/2022, every fire and rescue service in England and Wales was subjected to a statutory inspection by His Majesty's Inspectorate of Constabulary and Fire & Rescue Services (HIMCFRS). The inspection investigated how well the service performs in each of three areas. On a scale of outstanding, good, requires improvement and inadequate, Humberside Fire and Rescue Service was rated as follows:

Fire stations and appliances 

HFRS operates 31 fire stations. These stations are strategically located to provide suitable coverage for the region. Nine of these stations are wholetime, three stations are wholetime and retained, and 19 stations are retained only. The 31 stations are divided into four Community Protection Units (CPUs), with each one covering a different area.

The headquarters of HFRS are located on the western outskirts of Hull on Summergroves Way near the boundary with Hessle. This building houses the majority of the service's administration and support services including Stores, IT, Health & Safety, Training etc.

In 2005, Humberside Fire and Rescue ordered two Combined Aerial Rescue Pump (CARP) fire appliances, manufactured by TVAC on the Mercedes-Benz Econic chassis. The South Yorkshire Fire and Rescue Service also made an order for four similar appliances, with all six orders totalling £3 million. Shortly after their 2007 delivery, however, various mechanical defects emerged with both Humberside and South Yorkshire's CARP appliances, including them being too heavy for UK roads. This caused the appliances to be regularly taken off the road, with members of the Fire Brigades Union later refusing to operate them. Humberside's second order for a CARP appliance was subsequently cancelled, with TVAC going out of business shortly after reports of defects began to emerge.

Notable incidents
Humbrol factory, Hull  2 November 1988; started by the ignition of acetone spilled from a forklift, a large fire and explosions at the Humbrol paint factory in east Hull claimed the life of one employee and injured five others, requiring 125 Humberside firefighters and 25 appliances to extinguish the fire.
Royal Station Hotel, Hull  7 October 1990; up to 180 Humberside firefighters were on scene at a large fire at the Royal Station Hotel, caused by an electrical fault. Eleven of the 140 guests staying in the hotel were taken to hospital, and the building, which adjoins Hull Paragon Interchange, was completely destroyed.
Bartoline, Beverley  23 May 2003; Up to 150 HFRS firefighters and 28 appliances were deployed to a large fire and explosions from paint and oil storage tanks at the Bartoline factory on Swinemoor Industrial Estate in Beverley. The fire, which destroyed the factory and threatened to spread to adjoining buildings, was brought under control with no injuries reported.
2018 United Kingdom wildfires  JuneJuly 2018; HFRS fire crews were deployed to aid Greater Manchester and Lancashire firefighters in tackling major moorland fires on Saddleworth Moor and Winter Hill.
Bridgewood UK plastics factory, Hessle  2425 November 2021; A large fire and explosions, believed to have been started accidentally, destroyed the Bridgewood UK plastics factory on the Priory Park industrial estate adjacent to the town of Hessle. Over 150 HFRS firefighters and 14 appliances were deployed to tackle the fire, which destroyed 300 tonnes of plastic and also destroyed a nearby electrical substation. All employees of the factory were accounted for, and the fire was largely extinguished over 24 hours later.

See also
 Fire service in the United Kingdom
 FiReControl
 Firefighter
 Fire engine
 Fire apparatus
 List of British firefighters killed in the line of duty

References

External links

Humberside Fire and Rescue Service at HMICFRS

Fire and rescue services of England
Humberside